The R-73 (NATO reporting name AA-11 Archer) is a short-range air-to-air missile developed by Vympel NPO that entered service in 1984.

Development
The R-73 was developed to replace the earlier R-60 (AA-8 'Aphid') weapon for short-range use by Soviet fighter aircraft. Work began in 1973, operational in 1982 and the first missiles formally entered service in 1984.

The R-73 is an infrared homing (heat-seeking) missile with a sensitive, cryogenic cooled seeker with a substantial "off-boresight" capability: the seeker can detect targets up to 40° off the missile's centerline. It can be targeted by a helmet-mounted sight (HMS) allowing pilots to designate targets by looking at them. The weapon is used by the MiG-29, MiG-31, Su-27/33, Su-34 and Su-35, and can be carried by newer versions of the MiG-21, MiG-23, Sukhoi Su-24, and Su-25 aircraft.

Shortly after German reunification in 1990, Germany and other ex-Warsaw Pact countries found themselves with large stockpiles of the R-73 missiles or AA-11 Archers as designated by NATO, and had concluded that the R-73/AA-11's capabilities had been noticeably underestimated by the west. In particular, the R-73 was found to be both far more maneuverable, and far more capable in terms of seeker acquisition and tracking than the latest AIM-9 Sidewinder. This realization started the development of newer missiles to help compete, including the ASRAAM, IRIS-T  and AIM-9X.

According to an interview with a Ukrainian pilot, the R-73 does not track well in clouds. This makes the missile difficult to use against Shahed-136 drones, forcing pilots to rely on their 30 mm cannon.

From 1994, the R-73 has been upgraded in production to the R-73M standard, which entered Russian service in 1997. The R-73M has greater range and a wider seeker angle (to 60° off-boresight), as well as improved IRCCM (Infrared Counter-Counter-Measures). Further developments include the R-74 (izdeliye 740) and its export variant RVV-MD. These are expected to supplement previous variants of the R-73 in service.

An improved version of the R-74, the K-74M (izdeliye 750) features fully digital and re-programmable systems, and is intended for use on the MiG-35, MiG-29K/M/M2, Su-27SM, Su-30MK and Su-35S. A further upgrade, known as the K-74M2 (izdeliye 760), is intended for the fifth-generation Sukhoi Su-57 aircraft. This missile has reduced cross-section to fit in internal weapon bays and will match the performance of the AIM-9X and the ASRAAM. A clean sheet design, the K-MD (izdeliye 300), will supersede the K-74M2 in the future.

Operational history
On 24 February 1996, two Cessna 337s of the Brothers to the Rescue were shot down while flying over international waters 10 nautical miles outside of Cuban airspace by a Cuban Air Force MiG-29UB. Each of the aircraft was downed by an R-73 missile.

During the Eritrean-Ethiopian War from May 1998 to June 2000, R-73 missiles were used in combat by both Ethiopian Su-27s and Eritrean MiG-29s. It was the IR-homing R-60 and the R-73 that were used in all but two of the kills.

On 18 March 2008, a MiG-29 Fulcrum of the Russian Air Force intercepted a Georgian Elbit Hermes 450 UAV over Abkhazia. The MiG-29 destroyed the UAV with an R-73 missile.

On 27 February 2019, Indian officials claims that an IAF MiG-21 Bison had successfully engaged and shot down a Pakistani F-16 with an R-73E missile during the 2019 Jammu and Kashmir airstrikes. Pakistan denied the loss of its aircraft.

On 7 May 2022, Colonel Igor Bedzay, the deputy head of the Ukrainian Navy, was killed when his Mi-14 was shot down by a Russian Su-35. It is reported that after missing its first shots using its 30 mm cannon, the Su-35 resorted to launching an R-73, which destroyed the helicopter.

Use as a surface to air missile

These missiles have been used as a surface to air missile. In 1999 R-73s were adapted by Serb forces for surface to air missiles. The Houthi movement'S Missile Research and Development Centre and the Missile Force have tried to fire R-27/R-60/R-73/R-77 against Saudi aircraft. Using stockpiles of missiles from Yemeni Air Force stocks. The issue for the R-27R and R-77 is the lack of a radar to support their guidance to the target. However the R-27T, R-73 and R-60 are infra-red heat seeking missiles. They only require power, liquid nitrogen "to cool the seeker head", and a pylon to launch the missile. These missiles have been paired with a "US made FLIR Systems ULTRA 8500 turrets". However the drawback is that these missiles are intended to be fired from one jet fighter against another. So the motors and fuel load are smaller than a purpose built surface to air missile. Only one near miss has been verified and that was a R-27T fired at Royal Saudi Air Force F-15SA.

Variants
 R-73 - Standard model with ±40° off-boresight.
 R-73E - Export version of the standard model with ±45° off-boresight.
 R-73M - Improved model.
SAMAR - SAMAR Air Defence System (IAF)
 R-74 (izdeliye 740) - Improved model with ±60° off-boresight.
 RVV-MD - Export model of the R-73M with ±75° off-boresight.
 R-74M (izdeliye 750) - Improved model with ±75° off-boresight.
 R-74M2 (izdeliye 760) - Further improved variant with reduced cross-section for the Sukhoi Su-57. It serves as the Russian equivalent to the AIM-9X and ASRAAM.

Operators

Current operators

 300

 Used on Su-25KM Scorpion.

 Used on Mig-29 and Yak-130

Former operators

 Passed to successor states
 Passed to successor states.

Gallery

References

Further reading
 
 Yak-130 04. August 2013.

External links

 Air-to-air missile R-73E | Catalog Rosoboronexport
 RVV-MD
 warfare.ru
 astronautix.com
 bmpd.livejournal.com/3700881.html
 ВПК НОВОСТИ, ИСТОРИЯ ОРУЖИЯ, ВОЕННАЯ ТЕХНИКА, БАСТИОН, ВОЕННО-ТЕХНИЧЕСКИЙ СБОРНИК. BASTION, MILITARY-TECHNICAL COLLECTION. MILITARY-INDUSTRIAL COMPLEX NEWS, HISTORY OF WEAPONS, MILITARY EQUIPMENT

Air-to-air missiles of Russia
Air-to-air missiles of the Soviet Union
Cold War air-to-air missiles of the Soviet Union
Military equipment introduced in the 1980s
Vympel NPO products